USNS Chattahoochee (T-AOG-82) was launched on 4 December 1956 by Bethlehem Steel Corp., Staten Island, and delivered to the Navy for assignment to Military Sea Transportation Service on 22 October 1957. She was taken out of service and sold to a private concern in 2006.

References
  NavSource Online: Service Ship Photo Archive Chattahoochee (T-AOG-82)

Attribution
 

 

1956 ships
Ships built in Sparrows Point, Maryland
Alatna-class gasoline tankers